Coronation Island, also known as Garlinju, is located off the Kimberley coast of Western Australia. It is located off Port Nelson in the Bonaparte Archipelago, as a part of the group of islands known as the Coronation Islands, which were named by Philip Parker King, the first European to visit the islands in 1820, after the anniversary of the coronation of George III, who had died in January of that year.

The traditional owners of the area are the Wunambal peoples, in whose language group of Wunambal the name for the island is Garlinju.

Careening Bay (Wunbung-gu) is a bay on the island, where King careened his cutter, to make repairs. While on the island, the ship's carpenter engraved the name of the ship on a Boab tree (known as the Bodgurri by the Wunambal) that is still visible today. Parker did not observe any of the local people, but made observations in his journal on the other signs of life that they observed. He described not only bark shelters on the beach, but more larger and more substantial buildings on top of the hill. He also observed the remnants of sago palm nuts, which were commonly eaten along the coast.

There is a Makassan Islamic mihrab (prayer alcove) behind the boab.

Careening Bay is within the Prince Regent National Park and a permit is required to visit the site.

Priority flora found on the island include solanum cataphractum.

References 

Islands of the Kimberley (Western Australia)
Bonaparte Archipelago